Codington County is a county in the U.S. state of South Dakota. As of the 2020 United States Census, the population was 28,325. Its county seat is Watertown. The county was created in 1877 and organized in 1878. It is named for Rev. George S. S. Codington, Dakota Territory legislator.

Codington County comprises the Watertown, SD Micropolitan Statistical Area.

Geography

Codington County terrain consists of rolling hills dotted with lakes and ponds, especially in the southwest portion. The land is largely devoted to agriculture. The terrain is higher on the county's east and west sides, and generally slopes to the south.

Major highways

  Interstate 29
  U.S. Highway 81
  U.S. Highway 212
  South Dakota Highway 20
 South Dakota Highway 20P

Adjacent counties

 Grant County - northeast
 Deuel County - southeast
 Hamlin County - south
 Clark County - west
 Day County - northwest

Protected areas

 American Game Association State Game Production Area
 Blythe State Game Production Area
 Christopherson Game Production Area
 Clarksean State Game Production Area
 Codington County State Game Production Area
 Curley State Game Production Area
 Elmore State Game Production Area
 Gilbert State Game Production Area
 Goose Lake State Game Production Area
 Hanson State Game Production Area
 Horseshoe Lake State Game Production Area
 Larson State Game Production Area
 McKillicans Lake State Game Production Area
 North Nichols State Game Production Area
 North Stink Lake State Game Production Area
 Pelican Lake State Recreation Area
 Punished Womans Lake State Game Production Area
 Sandy Shore State Recreation Area
 Spencer State Game Production Area
 Spoonbill Pass State Game Production Area
 Thompson's Point State Lakeside Use Area
 Warner Lake State Game Production Area
 Wolf State Game Production Area (partial)

Major lakes

 Cottonwood Lake
 Dry Lake
 Goose Lake
 Grass Lake
 Horseshoe Lake
 Kings Lake
 Lake Kampeska
 Lake Nicholson
 Long Lake
 McKillicans Lake
 Medicine Lake
 Pelican Lake
 Punished Womans Lake
 Round Lake
 Still Lake
 Warner Lake

Demographics

2000 census
As of the 2000 United States Census, there were 25,897 people, 10,357 households, and 6,877 families in the county. The population density was 38 people per square mile (15/km2). There were 11,324 housing units at an average density of 16 per square mile (6/km2). The racial makeup of the county was 96.74% White, 0.14% Black or African American, 1.41% Native American, 0.28% Asian, 0.02% Pacific Islander, 0.57% from other races, and 0.84% from two or more races.  1.06% of the population were Hispanic or Latino of any race. 48.2% were of German, 20.0% Norwegian and 5.5% Irish ancestry, 96.7% spoke English, 1.5% Spanish and 1.2% German as their first language.

There were 10,357 households, out of which 33.60% had children under the age of 18 living with them, 54.50% were married couples living together, 8.10% had a female householder with no husband present, and 33.60% were non-families. 27.90% of all households were made up of individuals, and 10.80% had someone living alone who was 65 years of age or older.  The average household size was 2.46 and the average family size was 3.04.

The county population contained 26.80% under the age of 18, 10.40% from 18 to 24, 28.00% from 25 to 44, 20.70% from 45 to 64, and 14.10% who were 65 years of age or older. The median age was 35 years. For every 100 females, there were 98.50 males. For every 100 females age 18 and over, there were 96.50 males.

The median income for a household in the county was $36,257, and the median income for a family was $45,153. Males had a median income of $30,279 versus $19,826 for females. The per capita income for the county was $18,761. About 5.60% of families and 9.00% of the population were below the poverty line, including 8.60% of those under age 18 and 10.80% of those age 65 or over.

2010 census
As of the 2010 United States Census, there were 27,227 people, 11,432 households, and 7,216 families in the county. The racial makeup of the county was 95.3% white, 2.0% American Indian, 0.4% Asian, 0.3% black or African American, 0.6% from other races, and 1.3% from two or more races. Those of Hispanic or Latino origin made up 1.6% of the population. In terms of ancestry, 54.3% were German, 22.6% were Norwegian, 9.6% were Irish, 6.7% were English, and 3.3% were American.

Of the 11,432 households, 30.7% had children under the age of 18 living with them, 49.9% were married couples living together, 9.0% had a female householder with no husband present, 36.9% were non-families, and 30.6% of all households were made up of individuals. The average household size was 2.35 and the average family size was 2.93. The median age was 37.7 years.

The median income for a household in the county was $43,275 and the median income for a family was $60,202. Males had a median income of $39,076 versus $26,945 for females. The per capita income for the county was $24,781. About 8.9% of families and 12.7% of the population were below the poverty line, including 13.7% of those under age 18 and 16.8% of those age 65 or over.

Communities

City
 Watertown (county seat)

Towns

 Florence
 Henry
 Kranzburg
 South Shore
 Wallace

Census-designated place
 Waverly

Unincorporated communities

 Appleby
 Grover
 Kampeska
 Rauville

Townships

 Dexter
 Eden
 Elmira
 Fuller
 Germantown
 Graceland
 Henry
 Kampeska
 Kranzburg
 Lake
 Leola
 Pelican
 Phipps
 Rauville
 Richland
 Sheridan
 Waverly

Politics
Codington County voters have been reliably Republican for several decades. In no national election since 1976 has the county selected the Democratic Party candidate.

See also

Codington County Courthouse
National Register of Historic Places listings in Codington County, South Dakota

References

 
1878 establishments in Dakota Territory
Populated places established in 1878
Watertown, South Dakota micropolitan area